This article refers to sports broadcasting contracts in South Korea. For a list of rights in other countries, see Sports television broadcast contracts.

Multi-discipline events

Olympic Games
Summer Olympics: KBS, MBC, SBS (until 2024)JTBC (from 2028)
Winter Olympics: KBS, MBC, SBS (until 2022)JTBC (from 2026)

Asian Games
Asian Games: KBS, MBC, SBS, and JTBC

American football
National Football League: Coupang Play

Baseball
KBO League
 Regular season: KBS N Sports, MBC Sports+, SBS Sports, SPOTV and SPOTV2 
 Post-season: KBS, MBC, SBS

Major League Baseball
 SPOTV

Basketball
KBL: MBC Sports+
NBA: SPOTV

Combat Sports

Boxing 

 FITE TV: Top Rank and PBC
 DAZN: Matchroom, Golden Boy and Dream Boxing (October 2022 to October 2025)

Kickboxing 
 King of Kings: DAZN: October 2022 to October 2025, all fights

Mixed Martial Arts 

 Bushido MMA: DAZN: October 2022 to October 2025, all fights
 UFC: CJ ENM–tvN Sports/TVING
 ONE Championship: IB Sports and Coupang Play

Football

National teams 
 FIFA World Cup
 South Korea qualifiers (second round only) and overall countries finals tournament
 SBS (main)
 MBC
 KBS
 TV Chosun (second round only)
 Asian third round, fourth round and Asian play-off
 CJ ENM-tvN, tvN Sports, TVING
 Intercontinental Play-offs
 FIFA+
 Qualifiers only
 SPOTV (UEFA)
 AFC: CJ ENM (from 2021)
 AFC Asian Cup
 AFC Women's Asian Cup
 AFC U-20 Asian Cup
 AFC Futsal Asian Cup
 Friendly matches
 TV Chosun
 Coupang Play
 UEFA
 UEFA European Championship
 CJ ENM-tvN, tvN Sports, TVING (2024 finals tournament)
 SPOTV (2024 qualifiers)
 UEFA Nations League: SPOTV
 UEFA European Under-21 Championship: TV Chosun (2021)
 UEFA Boys and Girls Youth Championships (U-19 and U-17): TV Chosun

Clubs 
 K League 1
 Coupang Play (online streaming only)
 JTBC
 JTBC Golf&Sports
 IB Sports
 Sky Sports
 K League 2
 Coupang Play (online streaming only)
 Sky Sports
 IB Sports
 Life Sports TV
 KFA Cup
 Naver.com
 TV Chosun
 Coupang Play

International 
 AFC
 CJ ENM (from 2022)
 UEFA (2021)
 Men's/Boys:
 DAZN & SPOTV
 Champions League: DAZN & SPOTV
 Europa League: DAZN & SPOTV
 Europa Conference League: DAZN & SPOTV
 Super Cup: DAZN & SPOTV
 Youth League: DAZN & SPOTV
 Women's Champions League: DAZN & SPOTV
 Premier League: SPOTV and CJ ENM (tvN, tvN Sports, TVING)
 LFC TV: CJ ENM (tvN, tvN Sports, TVING)
 Tottenham Hotspur TV: SPOTV
 Emirates FA Cup: SPOTV
 EFL Cup: Coupang Play
 Ligue 1
 SBS Sports
 Coupe de France: DAZN
 DFL
 Bundesliga: Sky Sports
 Super Cup: SBS Sports
 DFB-Pokal: JTBC
 Eredivisie: Sky Sports
 CONCACAF Champions League: Sky Sports
 Leagues Cup: Sky Sports
 La Liga: SPOTV
 Copa del Rey: Sky Sports
 Major League Soccer:
 Apple TV+ (streaming on worldwide)

Futsal 

 FIFA Futsal World Cup
 SBS (main)
MBC
KBS
 UEFA
 Men's
 Euro (A-national team): TBA (2022)
 U-19 (national team): UEFA.tv
 Champions League (club): UEFA.tv
 Women's Euro (national team): UEFA.tv

Golf
Ryder Cup: Golf Channel Korea
PGA Tour: JTBC Golf&Sports
LPGA Tour: SBS Golf
JLPGA Tour: SBS Golf
KLPGA Tour: SBS Golf
European Tour: JTBC Golf&Sports

Handball

 IHF: TBA
 2021 World Men's Handball Championship
 2021 World Women's Handball Championship
 Super Globe
 EHF: Eurohandball TV

Tennis

Field 
 Australian Open: CJ ENM-tvN/tvN Sports/TVING
 French Open: CJ ENM-tvN/tvN Sports/TVING
 Wimbledon: JTBC Golf&Sports
 US Open: JTBC Golf&Sports
 Davis Cup: TBD
 Fed Cup: TBD
 ATP
 250: JTBC Golf&Sports

Table 

 World Championship of Ping Pong: Facebook and YouTube

Volleyball
 FIVB: IB Sports
 AVC: various
 V-League
 KBS N Sports
 SBS Sports
 Turkish Women's Volleyball League: SPOTV

Wrestling
WWE: IB Sports and MX
NJPW: MX
All Elite Wrestling: FITE TV (pay-streaming)

Other

References

South Korea
Contracts